Sir Henry William Rawson Wade  (16 January 1918 – 12 March 2004) was a British academic lawyer, best known for his work on the law of real property and administrative law.

Wade was educated at Shrewsbury School and at Gonville and Caius College, Cambridge. After a fellowship at Harvard University, he began his career as a civil servant in the Treasury, before being elected to a fellowship at Trinity College, Cambridge in 1946. From 1961 to 1976 he was Professor of English Law at Oxford University and a fellow of St John's College, Oxford, and from 1978 to 1982 Rouse Ball Professor of English Law at Cambridge University; from 1976 to 1988 he was Master of Gonville and Caius College, Cambridge. He held the degrees of MA and LLD, and the honorary degree of LittD from Cambridge University.

In 1985, he gave evidence for the defence at the trial of Clive Ponting for an alleged breach of the Official Secrets Act for revealing details of the conduct of the Falklands war, at which Ponting was acquitted.

He believed and first proposed that the "Parliament Acts are delegated, not primary, legislation"

Wade was an oarsman, mountaineer and a keen gardener in latter years.

References

External links
Obituary by Dr Christopher Forsyth, of the Cambridge Faculty of Law
Obituary in the Guardian newspaper

1918 births
2004 deaths
Alumni of Gonville and Caius College, Cambridge
English legal scholars
Fellows of the British Academy
Fellows of Gonville and Caius College, Cambridge
Fellows of Trinity College, Cambridge
Fellows of St John's College, Oxford
Harvard Fellows
Knights Bachelor
Masters of Gonville and Caius College, Cambridge
People educated at Shrewsbury School
Scholars of administrative law
Legal scholars of the University of Oxford
Rouse Ball Professors of English Law
Lawyers awarded knighthoods